Farah Mahbub (born April 10, 1965) aka Farah Jee is a Pakistani fine art photographer and a photography professor teaching at Indus Valley School of Art and Architecture, Karachi, Pakistan. Mahbub was awarded second prize in the fine art category at Px3 (Prix de la Photographie, Paris).

Biography
Mahbub graduated from PECHS College Karachi with Bachelor of Arts degree in 1987. She has been working as a professional photographer since 1988, doing fine art photography for personal self-expression and freelancing for publications. She has taught photography at Indus Valley School of Art and Architecture since 1997.

Publications with contributions by Mahbub
Chobi Mela IV. International Festival of Photography, Bangladesh, 2006.
Blue Print to Cyanotypes: Exploring Historical Alternative Photographic Processes. Stockholm, Sweden, 2006. By Malin Fabbri and Gary Fabbri.
Px3 Annual Book. 2007.
Journeys of the Spirit – Pakistan Art in the New Millennium. Salwat Ali. Pakistan, 2008.
Mazaar, Bazaar, Design and Visual Culture in Pakistan. Edited and designed by Saima Zaidi. 2009.
K’ Architecture. Edited by Arshad Faruqui and Amean J.. Black Olive Publication and the Institute of Architects of Pakistan, 2010.
Kam Sukhan, 9 Years of Kiran Fine Jewellery. Pakistan: Markings, 2013.

Exhibitions

Solo exhibitions 
 September 1993: Rendezvous with France, Alliance Française, Karachi
 December 1996: Intention, Sadequain Gallery, Frere Hall, Karachi
 February 2000: Hues Within, Sadequain Gallery Frere Hall, SG Forum Art Gallery (Alliance Française), Karachi
 November 2005: Ethereal Ether Echoes, V.M Art Gallery, Karachi
 March 2012: Baraka Silsila.e.Nisbat, V.M Art Gallery, Karachi

Group exhibitions 
 15 June - 14 July 2007: The Art of Digital Imagery, Center for Fine Art Photography Gallery, Fort Collins, Colorado, USA
 1994, 1995, 1996, 1997, 2004, 2006, 2007: PSK (Photographic Society of Karachi)
 September 2001: Karavan Karachi, Photography, Gallery Sadequain, Karachi, Pakistan.
 February 2002: An Idea of Perfection, (PNCA) Pakistan National Council of the Arts Alhamra Gallery, Lahore, Pakistan
 1 February - 13 March 2002: Interrogating Diversity, Betty Rymer Gallery, Chicago, IL, USA, online exhibition
 2002: Center for Contemporary Art, Sacramento, USA for the show Digital Visions.
 15 January – 2 February 2004: 11th Asian Art Biennale, Osmani Memorial Hall, Dhaka, Bangladesh.
 10–12 June 2004: Kodak Photo Vision 2004, PSK Photographic Society of Karachi at The Arts Council Of Karachi, Pakistan
 15–18 January 2005: Photo Exhibition Singular Medium: Multiple Frames at the Italian Cultural Center, New Delhi, India
 28 March – 3 April 2006: Artists’ Voices: Calligraphy, Amin Gulgee Gallery, Karachi, Pakistan. Co-curated by Sheherbano Hussain and Amin Gulgee.
 6–12 April 2006: Artists’ Voices: Body, Amin Gulgee Gallery, Karachi, Pakistan. Co-curated by Sheherbano Hussain and Amin Gulgee.
 31 May – 15 June 2006: Karachi 6 X 6: the Labyrinth, VM Art Gallery, Karachi. Co-curated by Abdullah Syed and Roohi Ahmed.
 12–21 October 2006: Special Exhibition: By a group of students and faculty of the IVS, the work depicts the rural Badin district of Sindh, Canvas, Karachi.
 20-30 Nov 2006: Chobi Mela IV International Festival of Photography, National Art Gallery, Bangladesh, Shilpakala Academy Shahbag, Dhaka, Bangladesh
 June–July 2007: Px3, Prix de la Photographie, 13 Sévigné Gallery, Paris
 2005–2011: Faculty Art 1, 2, 3, 4, 5, 6, IVS Gallery
 29–31 May 2009: ‘K’architecture', Karachi Expo Center, Karachi | IVS Gallery Karachi
 9 December 2009: There and Then, Mohatta Palace Museum, Karachi
 18–30 April 2011, The Family, VM Art Gallery, Karachi
 21 May – 8 June 2013: Kam Sukhan, IVS Gallery, Karachi

Awards
1993: Camera & Darkroom: Runner-up in Inclement Weather Contest, March 1993, CA, USA.
2007: “The Art of Digital Imagery”, Center for Fine Art Photography, Fort Collins, CO, USA, 15 June – 14 July 2007. Work by 50 photographers.
2007: Second Prize in Fine Art category, Px3, Prix de la Photographie, 13 Sévigné Gallery, Paris, June/July 2007, for “Lifelines & Manuscripts 25.”

References

External links
 
 INCOGNITO ...the weird and wonderful world of Photography
 Communication Design Faculty, Indus Valley School of Art and Architecture, Karachi
 PX3 2007 Honorable Mentions 

1965 births
Living people
Pakistani photographers
Pakistani women photographers
Indus Valley School of Art and Architecture alumni